Martin Fox (August 22, 1848 – September 28, 1907) was an American labor union leader.

Born in Cincinnati, Fox followed his father in becoming an iron molder.  He learned the trade at an early age, becoming a journeyman when only 16, and he joined the National Union of Iron Molders.  He moved to Covington, Kentucky, and while there, in 1878, became a trustee of the union.  From 1880 to 1886, he worked in the office of the president of the union, as a clerk, then in 1886 was elected as secretary of the union.

In 1890, Fox was elected as president the union, which had become known as the "Iron Molders Union of North America".  He also served on the executive of the National Civic Federation.  He stood down as president of the union in 1903, but continued working for it as a paid consultant, until his death in 1907.  He was buried in the Calvary Cemetery in Cincinnati, where his grave marker is by far the largest in the cemetery.

References

1848 births
1907 deaths
American trade union leaders
People from Cincinnati
Trade unionists from Ohio